François-Jude Gaulard (1787–1857), was a French archetier and bowmaker.

Biography
F.J. Gaulard was born in Mirecourt (Vosges) in 1787. Son of Louis Gaulard, a Mirecourt luthier and archetier / bow maker.
His early style of bowmaking suggests that François Jude Gaulard  worked with Louis Simon Pajeot.

"Gaulard, who spent most of his professional life in Mirecourt, started his own production of bows around 1785-1790. During the span of his artistic output, he left behind an important production of good quality bows in a large variety of woods (which include Pernambuco, snakewood, exotic wide grained wood and ironwood)."

His production of all kinds of bows is extensive and interesting, some being remarkably well made.
Around 1855 Gaulard left his home town of Mirecourt to join his son Louis Aguste, who ran a music shop in Troyes.
He died shortly after in 1857 in Troyes.
His bows are branded : "GAULARD.M." then "GAULARD" or unstamped.
He was registered as a violin and bow maker until 1854-55.

References 

 
 
 
 Les Luthiers Parisiens aux XIX et XX siecles Tom 3 "Jean-Baptiste Vuillaume et sa famille - Sylvette Milliot 2006
 
 

1787 births
1857 deaths
Bow makers
19th-century French people
Luthiers from Mirecourt